West Ham Poor Law Union was a poor law union established on 31 May 1836. It initially covered the parishes of East Ham, Leyton, Little Ilford, Walthamstow, Wanstead, West Ham and Woodford, with the addition of Cann Hall from 1894 onwards. This meant that it straddled several other urban districts, county boroughs and municipal boroughs set up later in the 19th century and early in the 20th century - West Ham (West Ham), East Ham (East Ham, Little Ilford), Wanstead (Wanstead), Woodford (Woodford), Leyton (Leyton, Cann Hall) and Walthamstow (Walthamstow). It ran the West Ham Union Workhouse.

External links
http://www.workhouses.org.uk/WestHam/

Poor law unions in England
Government agencies established in 1836
History of the London Borough of Redbridge
History of the London Borough of Newham
History of the London Borough of Waltham Forest
1836 establishments in England